Donald Ninian Nicol JP DL (3 October 1843 – 27 July 1903) was a British barrister and politician, who served as the Unionist Party MP for Argyllshire 1895 to 1903.

Early life and education 
Nicol was born in Liverpool, Lancashire, in October 1843 to a Scottish father & English mother. He was educated in Scotland, first at Merchiston Castle School, Edinburgh and at the University of Glasgow. In 1863 he entered Queen's College, Oxford, achievieng a BA in 1867 and an MA in 1872. He was called to the bar at the Middle Temple in 1870, and worked on the Northern Circuit.

Political career 
Nicol stood for election as the Conservative candidate for Argyllshire in the 1895 general election, where he defeated the incumbent Liberal MP Donald Horne Macfarlane. Nicol was re-elected at the 1900 general election with a 54% majority.

Personal life & death 
Nicol was married to Anne Millicent Bates (1849-1946), daughter of Sir Edward Bates, in 1874. They had 4 children.

Nicol suffered from heart disease in later life, and he died in July 1903 after suffering a severe illness. He was succeeded as MP in a by-election by Liberal candidate Sir John Ainsworth who Nicol had previously defeated in 1900.

Electoral history

1895 general election

1900 general election

References 

1843 births
1903 deaths
People educated at Merchiston Castle School
Scottish Tory MPs (pre-1912)
Unionist Party (Scotland) MPs
Members of the Parliament of the United Kingdom for Scottish constituencies
UK MPs 1895–1900
UK MPs 1900–1906
19th-century British politicians
20th-century British politicians
English people of Scottish descent
Scottish people of English descent

External links